Allium alabasicum is a species of onion native to Nei Mongol (Inner Mongolia) in China.

Allium alabasicum produces narrow, cylindrical bulbs. Scapes are usually round in cross-section, though sometimes with two angles; they are short, rarely more than 5 cm tall. Umbel generally has only 4 or 5 flowers. Tepals are purplish-red, up to 4 mm long. Ovary is round to egg-shaped. Stamens are shorter than the tepals.

References

alabasicum
Onions
Flora of Inner Mongolia
Plants described in 1992